Wyoming Valley Mall is a shopping mall located in Wilkes-Barre Township, Pennsylvania. It is anchored by JCPenney and Macy's.

History 
Work began on the mall in April 1968, when the land was purchased from the Blue Coal Corporation. Illegally dumped garbage from the East Side Landfill Authority was removed during early work. Sears opened before the mall in early 1971. Pomeroy's opened in August and JCPenney in April 1972. Wyoming Valley Mall did not become successful until Hurricane Agnes in 1972 caused significant damage to the surrounding area and the post-disaster need for supplies. Multiple movie theaters have existed at the mall, opening with two screens inside, and later adding another three outside. Zollinger closed in October 1977, with Hess's opening in May 1978.

Wyoming Valley, along with the Viewmont Mall, was sold by Crown American to PREIT in 2003. Wyoming Valley Mall was renovated in 2006 for $8 million, and received significant cosmetic changes. H&M opened at the mall in September 2017, occupying three storefronts. In April 2018, The Bon-Ton and Sears both announced they would close. Wyoming Valley Mall was undamaged during the June 2018 EF2 tornado, but lost power and was closed for a day. Bon-Ton, open since 1971 (originally as Pomeroy's), closed on August 29, 2018. Ken Pollock Auto Group opened a service center in February 2019 using the former Sears Auto Center.

The mall was turned over to its lender, GS Mortgage Securities Trust, by PREIT in late September 2019 after not being sold. PREIT owed $72.8 million on the loan, which had been in special servicing since July 2018. Wyoming Valley Mall had lost 75% of its 2014 $122 million value before being turned over. Jones Lang LaSalle took over the management of the mall in October 2019. Wyoming Valley Mall was sold to the Kohan Retail Investment Group for $17 million in August 2021.

Notoriety
The mall sits on land that was involved in the 1919 Baltimore Mine Tunnel Disaster.

References

External links
 Wyoming Valley Mall official website

Shopping malls in Pennsylvania
Buildings and structures in Wilkes-Barre, Pennsylvania
Tourist attractions in Luzerne County, Pennsylvania
Shopping malls established in 1971
1971 establishments in Pennsylvania
Kohan Retail Investment Group